Radio Wien is the regional radio for Vienna, and is part of the Österreich 2 group. It is broadcast by the ORF, and the programs from Radio Wien are made in the ORF Wien Studio.

Music
Radio Wien plays pop and rock music, often old songs but also newer ones. Most songs are sung in English but you can also hear German, Italian, French, Spanish and Portuguese.

Here are some examples of artists whose songs are played:
from Austria: Wolfgang Ambros, Falco, Rainhard Fendrich, Kurt Ostbahn, S.T.S.
from the rest of the world: ABBA, The Beach Boys, The Beatles, Bee Gees, Billy Joel, Blondie, Bruce Springsteen, Cher, Chris Rea, Creedence Clearwater Revival, David Bowie, Electric Light Orchestra, Elton John, Elvis Presley, Hot Chocolate, KC and the Sunshine Band, Madonna, Michael Jackson, Mike and the Mechanics, Phil Collins, Prince, Queen, Robbie Williams, Rod Stewart, The Rolling Stones, Stevie Wonder, Supertramp, Tina Turner, Toto, U2

Presenters 

Sascha BOCTOR
Carola GAUSTERER
Alexander GOEBEL
Pamela GRÜN
Alex JOKEL
Gerd KRÄMER
Angelika LANG
Martin LANG
Christian LUDWIG
Leila MAHDAVIAN
Peter POLEVKOVITS
Robert STEINER & Ratte ROLF-RÜDIGER
Peter TICHATSCHEK
Bernhard VOSICKY

Traffic
Karoline BOCTOR
Heidi MISOF
Bruni EIGNER

Reporters
Hadschi BANKHOFER
Rainer KEPLINGER
Julia KORPONAY-PFEIFER
Robert JAHN
Bernhard WEIHSINGER
Ewald WURZINGER
Ingrid REHUSCH

Weather
Gerald HOLZINGER

External links 
 

Radio stations in Austria
Mass media in Vienna
ORF (broadcaster)
Radio stations established in 1955
1955 establishments in Austria